Vladimir Valentinovich Krylov (born 26 February 1964) is a former Soviet athlete. He was Soviet 100, 200 and 400 metres champion, and also Soviet indoor 200 metres in 1989.

He was the  winner of gold medal in 4x100 m relay at the 1988 Summer Olympics.

A year later he was first in the European cup sprint relay, as well as third in the 100 metres.

Born in Sengiley, Sengileyevsky District, Ulyanovsk Oblast, Krylov trained at Dynamo in Ulyanovsk. He finished fifth in 400 m at the 1985 IAAF World Cup.

In the next year, at the 1986 European Championships, Krylov surprisingly won the 200 m and was third in 4x400 m relay. At the 1987 World Championships, he finished fifth in 200 m and was a member of Soviet 4x100 m relay team, which won the silver medal.

At the Seoul Olympics, Krylov reached the semifinals of 100 m, but did not start there. He was also a member of the Soviet 4x100 m relay team, which won the gold medal.

Krylov made his final start at the international championships at the 1990 European Championships, where he finished seventh in 100 m.

References

External links

1964 births
Living people
Russian male sprinters
Soviet male sprinters
Olympic athletes of the Soviet Union
Dynamo sports society athletes
Athletes (track and field) at the 1988 Summer Olympics
Olympic gold medalists for the Soviet Union
People from Sengileyevsky District
World Athletics Championships medalists
European Athletics Championships medalists
Medalists at the 1988 Summer Olympics
Olympic gold medalists in athletics (track and field)
Goodwill Games medalists in athletics
Competitors at the 1986 Goodwill Games
Competitors at the 1990 Goodwill Games
Sportspeople from Ulyanovsk Oblast